Taukum is a desert in the Almaty Region, Kazakhstan.

Geography
Taukum is a sandy desert that lies in the southwestern part of the Balkhash-Alakol Basin. It extends to the south of the lower course of the Ili River, from the southern end of Lake Balkhash to the Bozoi Plateau. The Maizharylgan and the Chu-Ili Range rise to the south of the desert. Lake Itishpes is at the northwestern end. 

Flora
The vegetation between sandy areas is made up of shrubs and grasses typical of arid zones, including sagebrush, saltwort, dzhuzgun, wormwood, saxaul and wheatgrass. There is a narrow stretch of riparian forest by the banks of the Ili river, at the northern limit of the desert.

See also
 Geography of Kazakhstan

References

External links

Kazakhstan (2/6): Kolshengel, Taukum Desert & Topar Lakes

Deserts of Central Asia
Deserts of Kazakhstan
Almaty Region